The 2010–11 NHL Three Star Awards are the way the National Hockey League denotes its players of the week and players of the month of the 2010–11 season.

Weekly

Monthly

Rookie of the month

See also
Three stars (ice hockey)
Georgia’s Own Credit Union 3 Stars of the Year Award, awarded annually to a player on the Atlanta Thrashers, based on "Three Stars" achievements
Molson Cup, awarded annually to a player on each of the six Canadian hockey teams, given out based on "Three Stars" achievements
Toyota Cup, awarded annually to a player on the Philadelphia Flyers, based on "Three Stars" achievements
NHL All-Star team

References

Three Star Awards
Lists of NHL Three Star Awards